Donnay is a commune in the Calvados department and Normandy region of north-western France.

Population

See also
Communes of the Calvados department

References

Communes of Calvados (department)
Calvados communes articles needing translation from French Wikipedia